Andersson is a lunar impact crater that lies in the southern hemisphere on the far side of the Moon. It is located just beyond the southwestern limb of the visible Moon in a location that can be viewed from the side during a favorable libration. The nearest crater of note is Guthnick to the north-northeast.

Andersson is bowl-shaped, with a small central floor and no significant erosion of the rim. It lies along a low ridge in the surface that runs to the north.

This crater lies near the center of the Mendel-Rydberg Basin, a 630 km wide impact basin of Nectarian age.

See also 
 9223 Leifandersson, asteroid

References

External links
 

Impact craters on the Moon